Najib ad-Dawlah, also known as Najib Khan Yousafzai, was a Rohilla Yousafzai Afghan who earlier served as a Mughal serviceman but later deserted the cause of the Mughals and joined Ahmed Shah Abdali in 1757 in his attack on Delhi. He was also a House chief of Rohilkhand, and in the 1740s founded the city of Najibabad in Bijnor district, India. He was instrumental in winning the Third Battle of Panipat.

He began his career in 1743 as an immigrant from the village Swabi, District Swabi Khyber Pakhtunkhwa, as a soldier. He was an employee of Imad-ul-Mulk but later deserted the cause of the Mughals and joined Ahmed Shah Abdali in 1757 in his attack on Delhi. He was then appointed as Mir Bakshi of the Mughal emperor by Abdali. Later in his career he was known as Najib ad-Dawlah, Amir al-Umra, Shuja ad-Dawlah. From 1757 to 1770, he was governor of Saharanpur, ruling over Dehradun. Many architectural relics of the period of Rohilla, the remains in Najibabad, were overseen by him, which he founded at the height of his career as a Mughal minister.

Biography
Najib Khan belonged to the Umar Khel section of the Mandanr Yousafzai. He migrated from Mohallah Nazar Khel village Swabi, district Swabi, now Khyber Pakhtunkhwa. He was born in Nazar Khel, village Swabi, Khyber Pakhtunkhwa. He migrated in 1739 to join his uncle Bisharat Khan, who had settled with his families of Pakhtuns at Bisharatnagar, near Rampur. In 1749, Ali Mohammed Khan, who had captured most of Rohilkhand by 1740, gave Najib Khan a northern portion, where he established the present day city of Najibabad, a state of Najibabad independent from other Rohilla tribes, and received the title, ‘Najib ad-Dawlah’.

Imad-ul-Mulk appointed Najib ad- Dawlah as the governor of Saharanpur. In 1757, Najib ad-Dawlah, who was then the governor of Saharanpur under Mughal Empire, invaded the city of Dehradun, with his army of Rohillas, and ruled the area for the next decade. His rule was known for its administration, and development of land resources, leading to widespread development and prosperity in the area, with emphasis on agriculture and irrigation. Many mango groves created during the area still exist today. Though after his death in 1770, the Maratha forces expelled the Rohillas from the Dun.

Conflict with Marathas

Battle of Delhi (1757)

Ahmad Shah Abdali's invasion of 1757 left Najib in effective control of Delhi who was appointed to the post of 'Mir Bakshi'. He had become the de facto ruler of Delhi, while the Mughal emperor was left with no actual power. His forces had to clash with the advancing Marathas in Delhi in the Battle of Delhi (1757). Delhi was captured by Marathas and he was allowed safe exit from Delhi.

Third Battle of Panipat

In the Third battle of Panipat, during the Maratha conquests, he allied himself with the Durrani Empire led by Ahmad Shah Durrani (also known as Ahmad Shah Abdali, against the Marathas. Najib Khan was clever enough to understand the changed realities after the Third battle of Panipat. His brilliant political acumen was used by Ahmed Shah Abdali to isolate Marathas & preventing them from getting even single ally during their conflict with Durrani's power. His refusal to sign treaty with Marathas, was the main cause of battle at Panipat. He provided, Ahmed Shah Abdali, with 40,000 Rohilla troops and 70 guns to the combined forces. He also convinced Shuja-ud-Daula, the Nawab of Oudh, to join Ahmad Shah Abdali's forces against the Marathas. In this battle, the Maratha's were defeated and as a consequence Rohilla Pakhtuns increased in power. However, the Marathas recovered in a short duration of 10 years and under Mahadji Schinde recaptured Delhi in 1771, reinstalling the weakened Mughal emperor Shah Alam II to the throne, under Maratha suzerainty.

After the war, he was made Mir Bakshi of Mughal emperor. He had to become ruler of Delhi state with empty treasury & territory confining to boundaries of Delhi city.

Najib Khan was a Pashtun soldier of fortune; he attained the hand of the daughter of Dunde Khan, one of the chieftains of the Rohilkhand Pathans. Rewarded by this ruler with the charge of a district, now Bijnor, in the North-west corner of Rohilkhand, he had joined the cause of Safdarjung, when that minister occupied the country; but on the latter's disgrace had borne a part in the campaigns of Ghazi-ud-din. When the Vizier first conceived the project of attacking the government, he sent Najib in the command of a Mughal detachment to occupy the country, about Saharanpur, then known as the Bawani Mahal, which had formed the jagir of the Ex-Vazir Khan Khanan.

This territory thus became in its turn separated from the Empire and continued for two generations in the family of Najib. He ruled the dwindled Empire for nine years, and died a peaceful death, leaving his charge in an improved and strengthened condition, ready for its lawful monarch.

Administrator of Delhi

As the Administrator of Delhi and the imperial heartlands including Agra, Najib ad-Dawlah, was unsuccessful in halting the Jat uprisings led by Raja Suraj Mal. During one massive assault, the Jats and their leaders overran the Mughal garrison at Agra plundering the city and looting the two silver gates to the entrance of the famous Taj Mahal in 1764.

Death
After protecting Rohilkhand, Delhi and Agra for nearly ten years as regent of the Mughal Empire he fell ill and died on 30 October 1770.

Successor
After his death he was succeeded by his son Zabita Khan. His cemetery is still in present day, Najibabad, where the Patthargarh Fort still exists.

Destruction of his tomb by the Marathas
His son Zabita Khan was defeated by the Marathas, led by Mahadji Sindhia (Shinde) in 1772 and the fort of Pathargarh was completely looted of horses, elephants, guns and other valuable things by the Marathas. This was done to avenge the deaths of Maratha warriors who fell in the battle of Delhi and Panipat, Marathas also destroyed the grave of Najib and scattered his bones.

A few years later, in the subsequent Rohilla War, the Rohillas were attacked by Awadh with help from British East India Company forces. When Hafiz Rahmat Khan was killed, in April 1774, they were defeated, and Rohilkhand was plundered; and later, the Rohilla power east of the Ganges was ended, and the final treaty by which the territory was incorporated in Awadh was concluded at Lal Dhang. The District was ceded to the British by the Nawab of Awadh, Saadat Ali Khan II in 1801.

In popular culture
 In the 1994 Hindi TV series The Great Maratha, Najib's character was portrayed by Irrfan Khan.
 In the 2019 Bollywood film Panipat, Najib, portrayed by Mantra, appears as one of the primary antagonists.

See also
Mughal Empire
Shah Alam II
Ahmad Shah Durrani

Further reading
  Najib-ud-Daula at Dehli The Fall of the Moghul Empire of Hindustan, by H. G. Keene. 1887, Part II, Chapter II, 1764.
 The Fall of the Mughal Empire by Jadunath Sarkar
Najib Khan (Najib-ud-Daula), a brilliant Yousafzai
Baloch proteges of Najib Khan Yousafzai
☆
Azad Patan Qabayel by Allabakhash Yousafi.
☆
Yousafzai Sardar Awr Hukamraan, Prof.Bakhtiar, Arshad Publishers, Swabi, 2012.
☆
Official Revenenue Record of Racial Tree Nazar Khel, village Swabi.

References

1770 deaths
Indian people of Pashtun descent
People from Bijnor district
Rohilla
1736 births
18th-century Indian Muslims
People from Khyber Pakhtunkhwa